Meet Monica Velour  is a 2010 American independent comedy-drama film written and directed by Keith Bearden.

The film premiered at the 2010 Tribeca Film Festival.

Plot summary 
A young man meets his dream woman (and isn't the least rather troubled that she's a washed-up porn actress 30 years his senior) in this independent coming-of-age comedy. Tobe Hulbert (Dustin Ingram) is a 17-year-old high school graduate who is the working definition of a loser—he's nerdy and socially inept, he lives with his eccentric grandfather (Brian Dennehy), his closest friend, Kenny (Daniel Yelsky), is only 12 years old, and he drives a beat-up hot-dog wagon with a giant frankfurter bolted to the roof. Among his other obsessions, Tobe is fascinated with adult movies of the 1970s and 1980s, and his favorite actress is Monica Velour (Kim Cattrall), who in her heyday was the hottest star in porn. When Tobe discovers there's a collector living in Indiana (Keith David) who is willing to buy his wagon for a good price and Monica Velour will be appearing at a gentleman's club nearby, he decides fate is smiling on him and hits the road. However, the "gentleman's club" turns out to be a sleazy dive and time hasn't been kind to Monica; when several patrons begin shouting insults at her, Tobe defends her honor and gets beat up for his trouble. Monica gratefully befriends Tobe and lets him stay at the trailer park she calls home; he begins to imagine he might have a chance with the woman of his dreams, but while she sees Tobe as a kindred spirit, she has bigger things to deal with, including a career that's going nowhere, an ugly relationship with her ex-husband, and a contentious battle to win back custody of her daughter.

Cast
 Kim Cattrall as Monica Velour
 Jamie Tisdale as Young Monica Velour
 Dustin Ingram	as Tobe Hulbert
 Brian Dennehy as "Pop-Pop"
 Jee Young Han as Amanda
 Daniel Yelsky as Kenny
 Keith David as Claude
 Sam McMurray as Ronnie
 Tony Cox as Petting Zoo Club Owner

References

External links
 
 
 

2010 films
2010s coming-of-age comedy-drama films
2010 independent films
2010 romantic comedy-drama films
2010s sex comedy films
American coming-of-age comedy-drama films
American independent films
American romantic comedy-drama films
American sex comedy films
2010s English-language films
Films about pornography
2010 comedy films
2010 drama films
2010s American films